Brad Self (born February 27, 1981, in Peterborough, Ontario) is a retired dual-sport athlete who was most recently a lacrosse player for the Colorado Mammoth of the National Lacrosse League and the Peterborough Lakers of Major Series Lacrosse league.  He has also played professional ice hockey in Germany. Brad Self is a Transition player, recently traded to the Colorado Mammoth at the NLL trade deadline. Selected in the second round of the 2001 entry draft 18th overall. Brad Self was a member of the Rochester Knighthawks during their three-peat championships in 2012,13, and 14. He is currently the general manager of the Colorado Mammoth. 
In 2019, Self was announced as one of the members of Chaos Lacrosse Club in Paul Rabil’s new Premier Lacrosse League.

References

1981 births
Living people
Buffalo Sabres draft picks
Canadian lacrosse players
Sportspeople from Peterborough, Ontario
Peterborough Petes (ice hockey) players
Rochester Knighthawks players
Saint Mary's Huskies ice hockey players